Calvin Eugene Garrett (born July 11, 1956) is an American retired National Basketball Association (NBA) basketball player. He played three seasons with the Houston Rockets (1980–81 to 1982–83) and one with the Los Angeles Lakers (1983–84).  He played in college at Oral Roberts University in Tulsa, Oklahoma.

References 
 

1956 births
Living people
African-American basketball players
American men's basketball players
Austin Peay Governors men's basketball players
Basketball players from Tennessee
Chicago Bulls draft picks
Houston Rockets players
Los Angeles Lakers players
Montana Golden Nuggets players
Oral Roberts Golden Eagles men's basketball players
People from Decatur County, Tennessee
Small forwards
21st-century African-American people
20th-century African-American sportspeople